The Asociación Guías Argentinas (Association of Argentine Guides, AGA) is the national Guiding organization of Argentina. It serves 3,251 members (as of 2006). Guiding was introduced to Argentina in 1915. The coeducational organization founded in 1953 became an associate member of the World Association of Girl Guides and Girl Scouts in 1957 and a full member in 1963.

Program

Program sections
The association is divided in five sections according to age:
 Ages 5 to 6: Pimpollito
 Ages 7 to 9: Alita (Little Wing)
 Ages 10 to 12: Guía en Caravana (Caravan Guide)
 Ages 13 to 15: Guía del Sol (Sun Guide)
 Ages 15 to 18: Guía Mayor (Senior Guide)

Guide Motto
The mottos of the sections are:
 Alitas: Siempre Mejor  (Always better)
 Guías en Caravana: Siempre Lista (Always ready/Be Prepared)
 Guías del Sol: Siempre Adelante (Always forward)
 Guías Mayores: Servir (To serve)

Guide Promise
Yo, siendo fiel a mi misma y a mis creencias prometo hacer todo lo posible para construir una sociedad mejor, ayudar a los demás en todas las circunstancias y vivir según la ley guía .

Guide Law
La Guía es digna de toda confianza.
La Guía es leal y responsible.
La Guía sirve y ayuda al prójimo sin esperar recompensas ni alabanzas.
La Guía considera a todos como hermanos.
La Guía es cortés.
La Guía ve en la naturaleza la obra de Dios y la respeta.
La Guía es obediente y disciplinada y nada hace a medias.
La Guía es alegre y enfrenta las dificultades con serenidad.
La Guía es económica y respeta el bien ajeno.
La Guía es pura en sus pensamientos, palabras y obras.

See also
Scouting in Argentina

External links
Official website 

Argentina
Scouting and Guiding in Argentina
Youth organizations established in 1953